In mathematics, the term small set may refer to:
Small set (category theory)
Small set (combinatorics), a set of positive integers whose sum of reciprocals converges
Small set, an element of a Grothendieck universe

See also
Ideal (set theory)
Natural density
Large set (disambiguation)